The Oaks is a two-level indoor/outdoor, regional shopping mall located in Thousand Oaks, California. It is owned and managed by Macerich. Accessible from US Highway 101 (the Ventura Freeway) midway between downtown Los Angeles and Santa Barbara, it is the largest shopping center in Ventura County. Over five million visit the mall each year.

Overview
The mall was originally built in 1978 and was renovated in 1993. Starting in February 2007, the center has undergone an extensive upgrade including interior finishes, restrooms, entrance canopies and skylights to reflect a modern Spanish and Santa Barbara-influenced design. Additional features include a 10-unit Spanish Dining Hall and amenities like family restrooms with granite, stacked flagstone and limestone tile. Centered on the theatre are four sit-down restaurants: Lazy Dog Cafe and Red Robin, which are both connected to a  retail expansion in an outdoor environment, while Olive Garden is located across the parking lot. The Cheesecake Factory is located inside the Shopping Center with patio dining available.

Larger tenants include Anthropologie, Urban Outfitters, Abercrombie and Fitch, Sephora, LUSH Cosmetics, Guess?, Apple,  American Eagle Outfitters and Dick's Sporting Goods.

It has featured several fashion shows highlighting the latest fashion in the retail stores. The shows were produced by Marilyn Shore Studios.

The Oaks Shopping center also offers a variety of activities for all holidays such as photos with Santa for Christmas, photos with the Easter bunny in April, and handing out candy on Halloween.

The annual ArtWalk presented by Conejo Valley Art Museum takes place at The Oaks. It features arts, designer crafts, outdoor exhibitions and live music.

Taxable annual sales at the 1.3 million sq. ft. mall are estimated at $300 million, generating yearly $3 million in sales taxes to the City of Thousand Oaks.

Anchors 
It is anchored by:

 AMC Theatres Dine-In Thousand Oaks 14 (106,000+ sq ft) (formerly May Co, Robinsons-May East, Carmike Cinemas, and Muvico Theaters) 
 J. C. Penney (148,165 sq ft.)
 Macy's / Women / Children's (127,410 sq ft.)  (formerly J.W. Robinson's and Robinsons-May West)
 Macy's / Men's / Home (144,000 sq ft.) (formerly Bullock's)
 Nordstrom (138,000 sq ft.) (formerly The Broadway, Macy's Women / Children's (original location))

Salto Ranch landmarks
Several trees planted by Richard Orville Hunt at the 19th century Salto Ranch can be seen at the intersection of Lynn Road and Hillcrest Drive. Hunt Olive Tree, which is located at 600 W. Hillcrest Dr., is designated Ventura County Historical Landmark No. 64 and City of Thousand Oaks Landmark No. 4. It is the last olive tree once part of an orchard planted by Hunt. Large eucalyptus trees planted by the Hunt family in the 1880s can be seen across the street, on the northwest corner of Lynn Road and Hillcrest Drive. The Hunt family originally moved to a house at today's corner of Lynn Road and Hillcrest Drive in 1888.

Popular culture
In 2005, The Oaks got featured in S1 E8 of Supernanny. Some of the stores shown in that scene are Build-A-Bear Workshop and Sephora. The glass elevator is also seen as well.

References

External links
 

Buildings and structures in Thousand Oaks, California
Shopping malls in Ventura County, California
Economy of Thousand Oaks, California
Shopping malls established in 1978
Macerich
1978 establishments in California